The 2003 Waveney Council election took place on 1 May 2003 to elect members of Waveney District Council in Suffolk, England. One third of the council was up for election and the council stayed under no overall control.

After the election, the composition of the council was:
Conservative 21
Labour 19
Independent 5
Liberal Democrat 3

Election result

Ward results

By-elections

Kessingland

References

2003 English local elections
2003
2000s in Suffolk